Jaminton Leandro Campaz (born 24 May 2000) is a Colombian professional footballer who plays as an attacking midfielder for Brazilian club Grêmio. He has made one appearance for the Colombia national team.

Club career
Campaz joined Campeonato Brasileiro Série A club Grêmio from Deportes Tolima in August 2021, having agreed a contract until December 2025.

International career
Campaz was selected for the Colombia national team for 2021 Copa América and made his debut on 17 June 2021 in a match against Venezuela.

Career statistics

Club

International

Honours
Grêmio
Campeonato Gaúcho: 2022
Recopa Gaúcha: 2022

References

2000 births
Living people
People from Ibagué
Colombian footballers
Association football midfielders
Colombia youth international footballers
Colombia international footballers
2021 Copa América players
Categoría Primera A players
Deportes Tolima footballers
Campeonato Brasileiro Série A players
Campeonato Brasileiro Série B players
Grêmio Foot-Ball Porto Alegrense players
Colombian expatriate footballers
Colombian expatriate sportspeople in Brazil
Expatriate footballers in Brazil